Cheddon Fitzpaine is a village and civil parish in Somerset, England, situated on the Quantock Hills  north of Taunton in the Somerset West and Taunton district. The village is situated near the Bristol and Exeter Railway, the Bridgwater and Taunton Canal, and the River Tone and has a population of 1,929.

History

Flint and pottery uncovered during archaeological excavations demonstrate late Neolithic to early Bronze-Age and Romano-British settlement sites near Maidenbrook and Nerrols. The name of the village was "Cedenon" probably meaning "wood valley" in 897. After the Norman Conquest it was granted to Roger Arundel and was then passed down through his family. The parish of Cheddon Fitzpaine was part of the Taunton Deane Hundred. In the 16th century the manor was bought by Thomas More of Taunton Priory.

Governance

The parish council has responsibility for local issues, including setting an annual precept (local rate) to cover the council's operating costs and producing annual accounts for public scrutiny. The parish council evaluates local planning applications and works with the local police, district council officers, and neighbourhood watch groups on matters of crime, security, and traffic. The parish council's role also includes initiating projects for the maintenance and repair of parish facilities, as well as consulting with the district council on the maintenance, repair, and improvement of highways, drainage, footpaths, public transport, and street cleaning. Conservation matters (including trees and listed buildings) and environmental issues are also the responsibility of the council.

The village falls within the non-metropolitan district of Somerset West and Taunton, which was established on 1 April 2019. It was previously in the district of Taunton Deane, which was formed on 1 April 1974 under the Local Government Act 1972, and part of Taunton Rural District before that. The district council is responsible for local planning and building control, local roads, council housing, environmental health, markets and fairs, refuse collection and recycling, cemeteries and crematoria, leisure services, parks, and tourism.

Somerset County Council is responsible for running the largest and most expensive local services such as education, social services, libraries, main roads, public transport, policing and fire services, trading standards, waste disposal and strategic planning.

It is also part of the Taunton Deane county constituency represented in the House of Commons of the Parliament of the United Kingdom. It elects one Member of Parliament (MP) by the first past the post system of election. It was part of the South West England constituency of the European Parliament prior to Britain leaving the European Union in January 2020, which elected seven MEPs using the d'Hondt method of party-list proportional representation.

Geography

Gadds Valley is an area of open grassland and woodland, which has been designated as a local nature reserve.

Landmarks

Pyrland Hall was built as a country house around 1760 for Sir William Yea and later became a boys preparatory school.

The nearby Hestercombe House and Gardens includes gardens designed by Sir Edwin Lutyens. Its restoration to Gertrude Jekyll's original plans (1904–07) have made it "one of the best Jekyll-Lutyens gardens open to the public on a regular basis", visited by approximately 70,000 people per year. The estate is Grade I listed on the English Heritage Register of Parks and Gardens of Special Historic Interest in England. The site also includes a 0.08 hectare biological Site of Special Scientific Interest as it is used as a roost site by Lesser Horseshoe Bats and has been designated as a Special Area of Conservation (SAC). The house was used as the headquarters of the British 8th Corps in the Second World War, and has been owned by Somerset County Council since 1951. It is used as an administrative centre and is the current base for the Somerset Fire and Rescue Service control room.

Religious sites

The Anglican parish Church of St Mary has a 13th-century tower and 15th century nave. The Old Rectory near the church was built around 1861, possibly by Edward Jeboult and later turned into 3 dwellings.

References

External links

Villages in Taunton Deane
Civil parishes in Somerset